Bardha is an Albanian mythological creature. According to old folklore, to propitiate them one strews cakes or sugar on the ground. It is similar to Zana e malit.

Appearance 
In Albanian popular belief they are pale, nebulous figures who dwell under the earth.

References

Bibliography 

Albanian legendary creatures
Fairies